The Never Ending Tour is the popular name for Bob Dylan's endless touring schedule since June 7, 1988.

Tour
The tour started off in Reno, Nevada at the Reno Events Center and the first leg came to an end on May 10, in Hollywood, Florida after 29 concerts.

The European leg of the tour started June 24 in Kilkenny, Ireland and came to an end on July 20 in Cosenza, Italy. Dylan and his band performed at several festivals during the tour including Live At The Marquee in Cork, Ireland and Roskilde Festival in Roskilde, Denmark. Dylan also performed his only concert in England of the year which was in Bournemouth at the Bournemouth International Centre.

After completing the European Tour Dylan returned to the United States to perform 21 concerts in ballparks across the States excluding one concert at the Bryce Jordan Center in University Park, Pennsylvania. Dylan also performed a private concert on Genentech Campus at University of California, San Francisco.

Dylan once again toured North America in the fall of 2006 performing 24 concerts in the United States and five concerts in Canada. This leg of the tour started on October 11 in Vancouver, British Columbia and ended in New York City on November 20.

Tour dates

Festivals and other miscellaneous performances

This concert was a part of "New Orleans Jazz & Heritage Festival".
This concert was a part of "Kilkenny Source Festival".
This concert was a part of "Live At The Marquee".
This concert was a part of "Roskilde Festival".
This concert was a part of "Cap Roig Gardens Festival".
This concert was a part of "Concierto Por La Paz".
This concert was a part of "Les Estivales de Perpignan".
This concert was a part of "Pistoia Blues Festival".
This concert was a private concert.

Cancellations and rescheduled shows

Box office score data

References

External links

 BobLinks – Comprehensive log of concerts and set lists
 Bjorner's Still on the Road – Information on recording sessions and performances

Bob Dylan concert tours
2006 concert tours